3rd FAI World Rally Flying Championship took place between August 28 -August 31, 1980 in Aschaffenburg in West Germany.

There took part 32 crews from 10 countries: Federal Republic of Germany (6), United Kingdom (6), Austria (6), Poland (4), Italy (3), Sweden (2), Luxembourg (2), South Africa (1), the Netherlands (1), Switzerland (1).

Most popular airplane was Cessna 150 (6 crews) and  Cessna 172 (6), then PZL-104 Wilga (4, Polish team), Piper PA-28 Cherokee (4), Cessna 152 (2) and Piper PA-24 Comanche (2). Other types were single (Piper PA-22, Grumman American AA-5, Morane-Saulnier MS-885, B-24R, Bölkow Bo 207, F-8L Falco, PN-68, SIAI Marchetti SF.260).

Results

Individual

Pilot / navigator / country / aircraft / points

Team
Two best crews were counted.

 - 5679
 - 5660
 - 5522

Sources
 3rd FAI World Rally Flying Championship

Rally Flying 03
1980 in aviation
1980 in German sport
Fédération Aéronautique Internationale
August 1980 sports events in Europe
1980 in West Germany
Aviation history of Germany